Point La Nim (2016 pop. 231) is an unincorporated community in Restigouche County, New Brunswick, Canada.

The community is located on the Restigouche River immediately upstream (west) from the town of Dalhousie. Its name was taken from Mi'kmaq name "ananimkik" which translates to "lookout place".
Located west of Dalhousie. Point La Nim's post office was originally called "Point La Nin" in 1855. It was renamed Point La Nim in 1862.

History

Notable people

See also
List of communities in New Brunswick

References

Communities in Restigouche County, New Brunswick
Designated places in New Brunswick
Local service districts of Restigouche County, New Brunswick